West Moor is a 213.0 hectare (526.3 acre) biological Site of Special Scientific Interest on the River Parrett in Somerset, notified in 1985.

West Moor lies south of Curry Rivel, Langport, and Drayton, and northwest of Kingsbury Episcopi and is part of the extensive grazing marsh grasslands and ditch systems of the Somerset Levels and moors. The site contains some of the most diverse aquatic plant communities in the country. Rhynes often have a rich aquatic flora Frogbit (Hydrocharis morsus-ranae). A rich invertebrate fauna, with many nationally and locally rare species is associated with the botanical diversity of the ditches.

References 

Sites of Special Scientific Interest in Somerset
Sites of Special Scientific Interest notified in 1985
Somerset Levels
Wetland Sites of Special Scientific Interest